Pedro de Unamuno was a Spanish soldier and sailor who was active in New Spain and Spanish East Indies, particularly the Philippines, in the second half of the 16th century. He is known for commanding the galleon Nuestra Señora de la Esperanza, that in the year 1587 undertook the second trans-Pacific crossing from the Asian mainland to the Americas in history, the first being the one achieved by his contemporary Francisco Gali in 1584.

Trans-Pacific journey
The voyage started in Macau on July 12, 1587 and reached the Californian shore on October 18, at 35.5 degrees North latitude, where they went on shore in a bay with sandy beaches (potentially Monterey Bay or Morro Bay) and made contact with some indigenous Californians. They then sailed progressively southwards along the Western American coast to Acapulco, reaching the area on November 22 of same year.

The main goals of the journey were to find the purported islands of Rica de Oro, Rica de Plata and Armenio (which Unamuno concluded did not exist), and also the profitable transport of Chinese goods to New Spain (which was a violation, like Gali's voyage three years earlier, of the monopoly accorded by the Spanish Crown to the Manila galleons). The official trade galleon of 1587 from Manila, the Santa Ana, reached the Californian coast one month later than the Esperanza but was then captured along with her cargo by two English privateer ships commanded by Sir Thomas Cavendish.

Unamuno had Alonso Gómez as pilot, a crew of Spaniards and Philippine Indios, and three Franciscan friars as passengers, namely Martín Ignacio de Loyola, Francisco de Nogueira, and a third one whose name is unknown. De Loyola brought along with him a young Japanese converted to Catholicism. This last sentence needs definitive source that the Japanese boy had boarded the frigate,  Nuestra Senora de Buena Esperanza, because page 144 of the Henry R. Wagner account,"The Voyage of Pedro de Unamuno to California in 1587" in The California Historical Society Quarterly. Jul. 1923 , says "Fr. Martin, nephew of the great Fr. Ignacio (De) Loyola, brought along with him a young Japanese boy whom he was taking to present to the King, “as he had a story to tell;“ but he had only 60 pesos expenses to buy European clothes.”

References

External links
 Wagner, Henry R.,"The Voyage of Pedro de Unamuno to California in 1587" in The California Historical Society Quarterly. Jul. 1923 
 Santos, Hector. "The characters on the galleon Esperanza" in Sulat sa Tansô. US, April 3, 1997.
 Santos, Hector. "The first Philippine indios in California" in Sulat sa Tansô. US, April 3, 1997.
 Santos, Hector. "Did Philippine indios really land in Morro Bay?" in Sulat sa Tansô US, April 9, 1997

See also
 João da Gama

Spanish explorers of the Pacific
People of Spanish colonial Philippines
People of New Spain
Colonial Mexico
16th-century Spanish people
16th century in the Spanish East Indies
Spanish East Indies
16th-century explorers